Discovery Train (French: La Découverte) was a mobile museum train operated by  National Museums of Canada. It toured the country of Canada for two years (1978–1980) with the purpose to help the Canadian people learn about their history.

The ~20 car red and white train toured the width and breadth of Canada. Fifteen of the cars had been used for the similar American Freedom Train in the United States from 1975–1976, before being bought by National Museums of Canada. The showcase cars from the Freedom Train were converted to tunnel cars.

To make such a train a reality took the cooperation of many organizations. The Canadian National and Canadian Pacific railroads handled the train free of charge. The Royal Bank of Canada, Labatt Breweries, General Motors of Canada, and the Great-West Life Assurance Company each donated C$400,000. Gifts totalling C$684,500 also came from The Devonian Group, The Richard Ivey Foundation, and the MacDonald Stewart Foundation. There was also a C$100,000 anonymous gift.

Richard Williams Studios made an advert film for the train.

Hundreds of thousands of Canadians rediscovered their country as they toured the train on its three-year journey.

References

External links
The Story of the 1978-1980 Canadian Discovery Train at ThemeTrains.com
Photos of the Discovery Train

Museums established in 1978
Museums disestablished in 1980
Defunct museums in Canada
History museums in Canada
1978 establishments in Canada
1980 disestablishments in Canada
National museums of Canada